Ryan Dunk (born October 14, 2000) is an American former competitive figure skater. He is the 2019 U.S. Junior National Championand 2019 CS Asian Open Trophy bronze medalist.

Early life 
Ryan Dunk was born on October 14, 2000. He began skating in 2009, after his mother brought him to a rink and he participated in a group lesson.

Career

2018–2019 season 
Dunk started his season by competing in the 2018 JGP series. At his first JGP event of the season he placed sixth in Bratislava, Slovakia. At his second JGP event he placed fifth in Yerevan, Armenia.  

He won his first junior national title in 2019 with 68.58 in the short program, 132.85 in the free skate, and 201.43 overall, more than five points above the silver medalist.
Dunk made his international senior debut at the 2019 Challenge Cup, where he finished fifth.

In 2018, Dunk moved to Boston to train under coaches Peter Johansson and Mark Mitchell.

2019–2020 season 
Returning to the Junior Grand Prix, Dunk was fifth at the 2019 JGP United States and sixth at the 2019 JGP Poland. Making his senior international debut on the Challenger series, he won the bronze medal at the 2019 CS Asian Open. He then appeared at his first senior U.S. national championships, coming in eleventh.

2020–2021 season 
In the pandemic-limited season, Dunk's lone competition appearance was at the 2021 U.S. Championships, where he came in eleventh.

2021–2022 season 
Dunk finished ninth at the 2022 U.S. Championships.

On April 5th, an article came out announcing that Dunk had retired from competition.

Programs

Competitive highlights 
CS: Challenger Series; JGP: Junior Grand Prix

Detailed results 

 ISU personal bests highlighted in bold.

References

External links 
 

2000 births
Living people
American male single skaters